van Ypersele de Strihou is a Belgian Noble House. Notable people with the surname include:

Jean-Pascal van Ypersele de Strihou (born 1957), Belgian academic climatologist
Jacques van Ypersele de Strihou (born 1936), Belgian politician and dignitary of the Belgian Court.

Yper